Golding is an English surname.

People
People with the surname include:

 Andrew Golding (born 1963), English cricketer
 Arthur Golding (c. 1536 – 1606), English translator
 Ashton Golding (born 1996), Jamaican rugby league footballer
 Belle Golding (1864–1940), Australian feminist activist
 Benjamin Golding (1793–1863), British doctor
 Bill Golding (1916–1999), Australian rules footballer
 Binker Golding (born 1985), British jazz musician
 Bob Golding (born 1970), English actor
 Bruce Golding (born 1947), Jamaican politician
 Frank Golding (1890–1966), Australian rules footballer
 George Golding (1906–1999), Australian runner
 Germaine Golding (born 1887), French tennis player
 Grant Golding (born 1981), Canadian gymnast
 Henry Golding (died 1576), British Member of Parliament
 Henry Golding (died 1593), British Member of Parliament
 Henry Golding (actor) (born 1987), British–Malaysian actor
 James Golding (cricketer) (born 1977), English cricketer
 James Golding (racing driver) (born 1996), Australian racing driver
 Jean Golding (born 1939), British epidemiologist
 Joe Golding (1921–1971), American football player
 Joe Golding (basketball) (born 1975), American basketball coach
 John Golding (artist and writer) (1929–2012), British artist and writer
 John Golding (British politician) (1931–99), British politician and trade union leader
 John Anthony Golding (1920–2012), Administrator of the Turks and Caicos Islands
 Jon Golding (born 1982), English rugby union player
 Joseph Golding, Irish football player
 Julia Golding (born 1969), British novelist
 Julian Golding (born 1975), English sprinter
 Leroy Golding, British actor
 Llin Golding, Baroness Golding (born 1933), British politician
 Lorna Golding (born 1951), First Lady of Jamaica
 Louis Golding (1895–1958), British writer
 Lynval Golding (born 1951), Jamaican-born British musician
 Margarette Golding (1881–1939), Welsh nurse and company director
 Margery Golding (c. 1526–1568), Countess of Oxford
 Matthew Golding (born 1980), Australian rules footballer
 Matthew Golding (dancer) (born 1985), Canadian ballet dancer
 Meta Golding (born 1971), Haitian-American actress
 Michael Golding, American novelist
 Mike Golding (born 1960), British yachtsman
 Miles Golding (born 1951), Australian classical violinist
 Monica Golding (1902–1997), British Army nurse
 Pam Golding (1928–2018), South African property developer
 Paul Golding (born 1982), British nationalist activist
 Peaches Golding (born 1953), High Sheriff of Bristol
 Pete Golding, American football coach
 Peter Golding, English fashion designer
 Philip Golding (born 1962), English golfer
 Richard Golding (died 1520), Irish judge
 Richard Golding (engraver) (1785–1865), English engraver
 Simon Golding (born 1946), Church of England priest
 Stephen L. Golding (born 1944), psychologist at the University of Utah
 Sue Golding (born 1958), American academic
 Susan Golding (born 1945), American politician
 Tacius Golding (1900–1995), Jamaican politician
 Val Golding (1930–2008), American magazine editor
 William Golding (1911–1993), English novelist and poet
 William Henry Golding (1878–1961), Canadian politician
 William Hughson Golding (1845–1916), founder of Golding & Company

Others
 Golding baronets
 Charles Golding (disambiguation)
 Edward Golding (disambiguation)
 Henry Golding (disambiguation)
 John Golding (disambiguation)
 William Golding (disambiguation)

See also
 Golding (disambiguation)
 Golding Bird (1814–1854), British medical doctor
 Golding-Bird (disambiguation)
 Goldin, a Jewish surname
 Goulding (surname)
 John Golden (pirate) (died 1694), English pirate also known as John Golding

References

English-language surnames